The 1907 Detroit College Tigers football team  was an American football team that represented Detroit College (renamed the University of Detroit in 1911) as an independent during the 1907 college football season. In its first season under head coach George A. Kelly, the team compiled a 1–3 record and was outscored by its opponents by a combined total of 59 to 6.

Schedule

References

Detroit
Detroit Titans football seasons
Detroit College Tigers football
Detroit College Tigers football